Bhucho Mandi Assembly constituency (Sl. No.: 91) is a Punjab Legislative Assembly constituency in Bathinda district, Punjab state, India. Its previous name was Nathana Assembly constituency.

Members of Legislative Assembly
 2007: Ajaib Singh Bhatti (Congress)

Election results

2022

2017

2012

References

External links
  

Assembly constituencies of Punjab, India
Bathinda district